The Strom Ministry was the combined Cabinet (called Executive Council of Alberta), chaired by Premier Harry Strom, and Ministers that governed Alberta from the party way through the 16th Alberta Legislature from December 12, 1968, to end of the end of the 16th Legislature and the swearing in of Premier Peter Lougheed on September 10, 1971.

The Executive Council (commonly known as the cabinet) was made up of members of the Alberta Social Credit Party which held a majority of seats in the Legislative Assembly of Alberta. The cabinet was appointed by the Lieutenant Governor of Alberta on the advice of the Premier.

List of ministers

See also 

 Executive Council of Alberta
 List of Alberta provincial ministers

References 

 

Politics of Alberta
Executive Council of Alberta
1968 establishments in Alberta
1971 disestablishments in Alberta
Cabinets established in 1968
Cabinets disestablished in 1971